Mamadou Camara (born 6 April 1988) is a French professional footballer who plays as a centre-back for ES La Rochelle.

Career
Camara started his career with Chamois Niortais, and was brought into the Niort team at the start of the 2008–09 season. He went on to play over 30 times in his first campaign, including one appearance in the Coupe de la Ligue, when Niort lost 2–1 to Créteil. On 26 July 2009, it was announced that despite Niort's relegation from the Championnat National, Camara had signed a contract to keep him at the club until the summer of 2010. On 23 January 2010, he scored his first league goal in the 1–1 draw with Albi at the Stade René Gaillard.

In August 2014, Camara signed a one-year contract with Strasbourg.

In June 2019, Camara joined Bourg-en-Bresse.

Personal life
Born in France, Camara is of Senegalese descent.

Career statistics

Honours 
Le Puy

 Championnat National 2: 2021–22

References

External links
 
 
 

1988 births
Living people
People from Niort
Sportspeople from Deux-Sèvres
French footballers
French sportspeople of Senegalese descent
Black French sportspeople
Association football midfielders
Chamois Niortais F.C. players
En Avant Guingamp players
CA Bastia players
RC Strasbourg Alsace players
Vendée Fontenay Foot players
US Boulogne players
Lyon La Duchère players
Football Bourg-en-Bresse Péronnas 01 players
Le Puy Foot 43 Auvergne players
ES La Rochelle players
Ligue 2 players
Championnat National players
Championnat National 2 players
Championnat National 3 players
Footballers from Nouvelle-Aquitaine